Fishkill is a town in the southwestern part of Dutchess County, New York, United States. The population was 22,107 at the 2010 census. Fishkill surrounds the city of Beacon, and contains a village, which is also named Fishkill.

The name Fishkill derives from the Dutch words vis kill, meaning "fish creek". The location of Fishkill was known as Tioranda by the Native American peoples. The name means "The place where two waters meet". Fishkill is one of the nine original towns in Dutchess County, and is best known today for its rich history dating to the American Revolutionary War period and scenic views of the Hudson Highlands.

History
In 1683 New York City merchants Francis Rombouts and Gulian Verplanck purchased  in Dutchess County from the Wappinger confederacy of Native Americans for a quantity of goods including rum, powder, and tobacco. In 1685 it was granted as the royal Rombout Patent.  Neither ever lived on the land, intending to use it only for fur trading. The first white settlers were Rombout's daughter, Catheryna, and her husband, Roger Brett, who built a mill at the mouth of Fishkill Creek as it flows into the Hudson River.

Originally, the boundaries of Fishkill extended far beyond the boundaries of the present-day Town of Fishkill. When the town was incorporated in 1788, Fishkill's land area included the present-day City of Beacon and Village of Fishkill, as well as the Town of Wappinger, Village of Wappingers Falls, Town of East Fishkill and a portion of the Town of LaGrange. During the 19th century, as other towns incorporated, Fishkill's area was reduced until the incorporation of the City of Beacon in 1913 resulted in Town boundaries approximate to modern town lines.

Fishkill lays claim to a strong Native American heritage, and a number of areas within the town retain their Native American names, including Matteawan Road and the hamlet of Wiccopee, which overlaps into the modern town of East Fishkill. Daniel Nimham, the final sachem of the Wappinger people, was born in the Wiccopee area in 1726. Nimham rose to prominence as both an advocate for Native American land rights and as a soldier, serving as both a spokesman arguing in England for the enforcement of land treaties, and the leader of the Stockbridge Militia, which fielded a force of approximately 300 Native American warriors of Wappinger and Mohican identity. The Stockbridge Militia fought on the side of the British in the French and Indian War, and then on the side of the Continental Army during the American Revolution. Nimham and his Stockbridge soldiers were some of America's first combat veterans. Nimham was killed at the Battle of Kingsbridge in what is now the Bronx on August 31, 1778.

Fishkill played a pivotal role in the American Revolutionary War when a huge military encampment known as the Fishkill Supply Depot was established one mile (1.6 km) south of the village of Fishkill to guard the mountain pass to the south. Signal fires lay in readiness on tops of the surrounding mountains. The Fishkill encampment became the main supply depot for the northern department of the Continental Army. The first copies of the New York State Constitution were printed at Fishkill in 1777. Mount Beacon, located in the town, earned its name for the signal fires at the summit which were used for Continental Army communications during the war.

As commander of the Continental Army, George Washington spent considerable time in Fishkill, and in 1778, noted Fishkill silversmith John Bailey crafted a sword for Washington near present-day Maurer-Geering Park. The sword was a particular favorite of Washington's, and he carried it for the remainder of the war. Upon his death, Washington bequeathed a sword to each of his five nephews, and nephew Samuel Washington received the Bailey sword. He donated it to Congress in 1843. The sword is now lies in the Smithsonian Institution, as part of the National Museum of American History.

In the 19th century, mills and factories sprang up in Glenham and Matteawan, bringing an influx of skilled weavers from the British Isles. The healthy economy came to an end in the post–Civil War depression, and the once thriving factories fell into decay. In 1931, Texaco purchased the old woolen mill site and established a research center there. Today, the town's economy is diverse, comprising tourism, medical care, retail and restaurants, warehouses, recreation spots and a wealth of small businesses.

In 1996, the animal rights group PETA suggested the town change its name to something less suggestive of violence toward fish. The name derives from the Dutch vis kill, meaning "fish creek." For this reason, the town declined. Town Supervisor Ozzy Albra has indicated he will not entertain changing the name of the town.

In 2021, the Town commissioned an eight-foot bronze statue depicting Daniel Nimham from noted Hudson Valley sculptor Michael Keropian. The statue was installed at the Arrowhead intersection of NY-52 and NY-82 (41° 32.685′ N, 73° 52.16′ W.) in May of 2022 and dedicated on June 11, 2022. Town Supervisor Ozzy Albra hosted the ceremony which featured comments from elected officials, educators, the sculptor, and a number of special presentations by Native American community groups.

Government

The Town of Fishkill is overseen by a Town Supervisor a Town Council, comprising four Councilmembers. The Town Supervisor and Town Council are elected to four-year terms, and town law limits the Town Supervisor and Town Council to two terms of service. As of 2022, the Town Supervisor is Ozzy Albra, and the Town Council consists of Louise Daniele, John Forman, Carmine Istvan and Brian Wrye.

Tourism
Fishkill is home to a number of tourist locations, including a number of historically significant sites. Popular sites include:

 Dutchess Stadium, home of the Hudson Valley Renegades, the High-A Minor League affiliate of the New York Yankees
SplashDown Beach, a seasonal water and amusement park 
 Van Wyck Homestead Museum and Fishkill Supply Depot
 Mount Gulian
 Stony Kill Farm
In 2021, it was announced the town would work with sculptor Michael Keropian to commission a statue of Wappinger tribal leader Daniel Nimham, as part of an effort by the town to promote historical tourism in Fishkill. The statue was installed in May 2022 and dedicated on June 11, 2022.

Geography

The southern town line is the border between Dutchess and Putnam counties and between the towns of Fishkill and Philipstown. The western town line is defined by the Hudson River, across which lie the Orange County towns of Cornwall, New Windsor, and Newburgh, as well as the city of Newburgh. The city of Beacon is contained within the town, though Fishkill's area west of Beacon is mostly occupied by the Hudson. To the north is the town of Wappinger, and to the east is the town of East Fishkill.

The town's namesake, the Fishkill Creek, runs from east to west across the town and empties into the Hudson River. As the word Fishkill derives from the Dutch vis kill, meaning "fish creek," the English use of "Fishkill Creek" creates a bilingual tautology. 

Interstate 84 passes through the town in an east-west direction, with access from Exits 41, 44, and 46 (old Exits 11, 12, and 13), and US 9 passes through both the town and village of Fishkill in a north-south direction.

Demographics

As of the census of 2000, there were 20,258 people, 6,856 households, and 4,264 families residing in the town. The population density was 738.9 people per square mile (285.3/km2). The racial makeup of the town was 77.19% White, 14.13% African American, 0.19% Native American, 2.99% Asian, 0.02% Pacific Islander, 4.49% from other races, and 0.99% from two or more races. Of the population 10.47% were Hispanic or Latino of any race.

There were 6,856 households, out of which 27.7% had children under the age of 18 living with them, 51.0% were married couples living together, 8.1% had a woman whose husband does not live with her, and 37.8% were non-families. 32.5% of all households were made up of individuals, and 12.6% had someone living alone who was 65 years of age or older.  The average household size was 2.35 and the average family size was 3.02.

In the town, the population was spread out, with 18.3% under the age of 18, 7.1% from 18 to 24, 38.1% from 25 to 44, 22.3% from 45 to 64, and 14.1% who were 65 years of age or older.  The median age was 38 years.

The median income for a household in the town was $52,745, and the median income for a family was $63,574. Males had a median income of $42,106 versus $32,198 for females. The per capita income for the town was $22,662.  5.4% of the population and 3.4% of families were below the poverty line.  Out of the total people living in poverty, 6.2% were under the age of 18 and 7.5% were 65 or older.

Sports

Fishkill is home to the Hudson Valley Renegades, a minor league baseball team affiliated with the New York Yankees, which plays in the new High-A East league. Previously the team was a member of the short-season New York–Penn League from 1994 to 2020, and had been an affiliate of the Tampa Bay Rays. The Renegades play at Dutchess Stadium.

Notable people

Elizabeth Allen 1929-2006, theatre, television and film actor and singer; lived in Fishkill prior to her death.
Catheryna Rombout Brett 1687-1764, landowner and businesswoman; owned a considerable portion of Dutchess County in the colonial period.
Elijah A. Briggs 1843-1922, American Civil War soldier and Medal of Honor recipient; lived in Fishkill for many years prior to his death.
Robert Kanigher 1915-2002, comic book, playwright, television and film writer for DC Comics noted for writing Wonder Woman and The Flash lived in Fishkill prior to his death.
Marquis de Lafayette 1757-1834, French noble and military leader who assisted Washington during the Revolutionary War; was nursed to health after a long illness in Fishkill.
Daniel Nimham 1726-1778, final sachem of the Wappinger people and American Revolutionary War combat veteran; born in Fishkill in 1726.
Benjamin Strong Jr. 1872-1928, banker and Governor of the Federal Reserve Bank of New York.
George Washington 1733-1999, first President of the United States; commanded the Continental Army in Fishkill for much of the American Revolution.

See also

Fishkill Correctional Facility
Mount Gulian
Stony Kill Farm
Van Wyck Homestead Museum

References

External links

 Town of Fishkill official website
 Village of Fishkill
 Fishkill area information
  Blodgett Memorial Library (Fishkill)
 Fishkill Creek Watershed Committee
 Rombout Fire Company
 Fishkill Reformed Church
 Fishkill Historical Society

 
Poughkeepsie–Newburgh–Middletown metropolitan area
Towns in Dutchess County, New York
New York (state) populated places on the Hudson River
Towns in the New York metropolitan area